Ricardo João de Almeida Torrão (born 18 February 1991) is a Macanese former professional footballer who played as a midfielder. He made three appearances for the Macau national team scoring one goal.

Career statistics

Club

International

Score and result list Macau's goal tally first, score column indicates score after Torrão goal.

References

1991 births
Living people
South African soccer players
South African expatriate soccer players
Macau footballers
Macau international footballers
Portuguese footballers
Association football midfielders
Hong Kong Premier League players
C.F. Estrela da Amadora players
G.D. Lam Pak players
Chengdu Tiancheng F.C. players
C.D. Mafra players
Windsor Arch Ka I players
BSV Schwarz-Weiß Rehden players
S.L. Benfica de Macau players
Portuguese expatriate sportspeople in China
South African expatriate sportspeople in China
Expatriate footballers in China
Portuguese expatriate sportspeople in Hong Kong
South African expatriate sportspeople in Hong Kong
Expatriate footballers in Hong Kong
Portuguese expatriate sportspeople in Germany
South African expatriate sportspeople in Germany
Expatriate footballers in Germany